Dorothy Howell (May 10, 1899 – June 8, 1971), was an American screenwriter active mostly during the 1920s and 1930s.

Born to Elmer Howell and Carrie Lorenz, Dorothy was raised in Illinois alongside her younger brother Raymond. Raymond would go on to work at Hollywood studios as a technician, according to census records.

Howell worked as a scenarist and screenwriter for Columbia for much of her career. She started out at Columbia as Harry Cohn's secretary and was appointed assistant general production manager at the company in 1926. Before joining Columbia, she had also worked as a secretary to executives Irving Thalberg and B.P. Schulberg.

She was married to Mendel B. Silverberg, a prominent entertainment lawyer (who had previously been married to Alice Calhoun).

Selected filmography 

 Quest for the Lost City (1955)
 I'll Fix It (1934) (story)
 Whirlpool (1934)
 The Final Edition (1932)
 Men in Her Life (1931)
 Fifty Fathoms Deep (1931)
 Lover Come Back (1931)
 The Last Parade (1931)
 Men Without Law (1930)
 For the Love o' Lil (1930)
The Squealer  (1930)
 The Donovan Affair (1929)
 The Street of Illusion (1929)
 Submarine (1928)
 Runaway Girls (1928)
 Virgin Lips (1928)
 The Reckoning (1928)
 Rich Men's Sons (1927)
 The Kid Sister (1927)
 Playing Straight (1927)
 The Romantic Age (1927)
 Birds of Prey (1927)
 Stage Kisses (1927)
 The Price of Honor (1927)
 The Better Way (1926)
 A Fight to the Finish (1925)
 Fighting Youth (1925)
 The New Champion (1925)
 Unmarried Wives (1924)

References

1899 births
1971 deaths
American women screenwriters
Screenwriters from Illinois
People from Chicago
20th-century American women writers
20th-century American screenwriters